Stian Neset (born 14 April 1974 in Norway) is a Norwegian retired footballer.

Career
Neset made 6 appearances for Sogndal Fotball in the Norwegian top flight before spending the rest of his career in the Norwegian lower leagues.

Despite playing in the Norwegian lower leagues for the majority of his career, Neset was known on the video game Championship Manager: Season 97/98 for his potential.

External links
 Stian Neset at Norges Fotballforbund

Norwegian footballers
Living people
Association football midfielders
1974 births
Sogndal Fotball players
FK Vidar players
Løv-Ham Fotball players
Eliteserien players